Volker Rolf Berghahn (born 15 February 1938) is a historian of German and modern European history at Columbia University. His research interests have included the fin de siècle period in Europe, the origins of World War I, and German-American relations. He received his M.A. from the University of North Carolina at Chapel Hill in 1961 and his PhD, under supervision of Francis L. Carsten, from the University of London in 1964. Prior to teaching in the United States, Berghahn worked in the United Kingdom and Germany. In 1988, he accepted a position at Brown University, and moved to Columbia ten years later.

Berghahn now holds the chair of Seth Low Professor of History at Columbia, and is also a Fellow of the Royal Historical Society.

Bibliography

 
 Der Tirpitz-Plan (1971)
 Germany And The Approach Of War In 1914 (1973) 
 Germany in the Age of Total War (with Martin Kitchen), (London: Croom Helm; Totowa N.J.: Barnes and Noble, 1981)
 Modern Germany (1982)
 The Americanization of West German Industry, 1945–1973 (1986)
 Imperial Germany: 1871–1914 economy, society, culture, and politics (1994)
 Quest for Economic Empire, ed. (1996)
 Der Untergang des alten Europas, 1900–1929 (1999)
 America and the Intellectual Cold Wars in Europe (2001)
 Der Erste Weltkrieg (2003)
 Europe in the Era of Two World Wars: From Militarism and Genocide to Civil Society, 1900–1950 (English translation 2005)
 Gibt es einen deutschen Kapitalismus? Tradition und globale Perspektiven der sozialen Marktwirtschaft (2006)
 
Industriegesellschaft und Kulturtransfer: Die deutsch-amerikanischen Beziehungen im 20. Jahrhundert. Göttingen: Vandenhoeck & Ruprecht, 2010, 
Umbau im Wiederaufbau: Amerika und die deutsche Industrie im 20. Jahrhundert. Göttingen: Wallstein, 2013, 
Journalists between Hitler and Adenauer: From Inner Emigration to the Moral Reconstruction of West Germany. Princeton, NJ: Princeton University Press, 2019, 
Hans-Günther Sohl als Stahlunternehmer und Präsident des Bundesverbandes der Deutschen Industrie: 1906–1989. Göttingen: Wallstein, 2020,

External links 
 Columbia University faculty page
 Books by Volker Berghahn at Amazon.com
 Criticism by Václav Klaus 

1938 births
Living people
Writers from Berlin
20th-century German historians
University of North Carolina at Chapel Hill alumni
Alumni of the University of London
Columbia University faculty
German male non-fiction writers
21st-century German historians
Fellows of the Royal Historical Society
Brown University faculty